Nadia Petrova and Meghann Shaughnessy were the defending champions, but were forced to withdraw as Shaughnessy suffered a lower back injury during her singles match against Peng Shuai.

Bryanne Stewart and Samantha Stosur won the title by defeating Květa Peschke and Patty Schnyder 6–4, 6–2 in the final.

Seeds

Draw

Draw

External links
 ITF tournament edition details

Bausch & Lomb Championships - Doubles
Doubles